The 1993 France rugby union tour of South Africa was a series of eight matches played by the France national rugby union team in South Africa in June and July 1993. The French team won four matches, drew two and lost two. They won their two match international series against the South Africa national rugby union team, drawing the first game and winning the second for a one-nil series victory. The tour was marred by a serious facial injury suffered by the captain, Jean-François Tordo, who was raked by Garry Pagel in the match against Western Province. Tordo required 50 stitches and plastic surgery and took no further part in the tour.

Results
Scores and results list France's points tally first.

Touring party

Manager: Guy Laporte
Coach: Pierre Berbizier
Assistant coach: Christophe Mombet
Captain: Jean-François Tordo, replaced by Olivier Roumat

Full backs
Jean-Luc Sadourny (US Colomiers)
Olivier Campan (SU Agen Lot-et-Garonne)

Three-quarters
Peyo Hontas (Biarritz Olympique)
Philippe Saint-André (AS Montferrand)
Philippe Bernat-Salles (Pau)
David Berty (Stade Toulousain)
Philippe Sella (SU Agen Lot-et-Garonne)
Thierry Lacroix (US Dax)
Herve Couffignal (US Colomiers)
Pierre Bondouy (RC Narbonne)

Half-backs
Alain Penaud (CA Brive)
Pierre Montlaur (SU Agen Lot-et-Garonne)
Aubin Hueber (RC Toulonnais)
Jérôme Cazalbou (Stade Toulousain)

Forwards
Louis Armary (FC Lourdes
Laurent Seigne (SU Agen Lot-et-Garonne
Stéphane Graou (FC Auch Gers)
Emmanuel Ménieu (Stade Bordelais)
Jean-François Tordo (Nice)
Jean-Michel Gonzalez (Aviron Bayonnais)
Olivier Roumat (US Dax)
Abdelatif Benazzi (SU Agen Lot-et-Garonne)
Olivier Merle (FC Grenoble)
Yann Lemeur (Racing Club de France)
Philippe Benetton (SU Agen Lot-et-Garonne)
Laurent Cabannes (Racing Club de France)
Léon Loppy (RC Toulonnais
Jean-Marc Lhermet (AS Montferrand
Marc Cécillon (CS Bourgoin-Jallieu)
Xavier Blond (Racing Club de France)
Laurent Verge (CA Bordeaux-Bègles Gironde) replacement during tour
Christophe Deslandes (Racing Club de France) replacement during tour

References

1993
1993 rugby union tours
1993 in South African rugby union
1992–93 in French rugby union